Spring/Break Art Show is an annual contemporary art show held in New York that coincides with The Armory Show each spring. From 2012 to 2014, the show was held in a schoolhouse in Nolita, but in 2015 the show took place in the historic Moynihan Station next to New York Penn Station.

References

Annual events in New York City